The 1986 Copa Interamericana was the 10th staging of this competition. The final took place between River Plate (Winners of the 1986 Copa Libertadores) and L.D. Alajuelense (winners of the 1986 CONCACAF Champions' Cup) and was staged over two legs on 21 July 1987 and 16 August 1987. River Plate won their first Copa Interamericana.

The first leg was played in Alajuela on July 21, 1987, and ended in a 0–0 tie. The second leg was held in Estadio Monumental, Buenos Aires, where River Plate won 3–0 therefore the Argentine side won its first Interamericana Cup.

Qualified teams

Venues

Match details

First Leg

Second Leg

References 

Inter
i
i
Football in Buenos Aires
Inter
Copa Interamericana